Mudassar Baig (born 17 April 1979, in Faisalabad) is a Pakistani para-athlete.

Background
Baig was disabled after he fractured his leg playing football in school and the doctor treating him botched his treatment. He is married with one daughter. He is employed by Pakistan Post in his home town.

References

1979 births
Living people
Athletes from Punjab, Pakistan
Sportspeople from Faisalabad
Pakistani disabled sportspeople
Track and field athletes with disabilities
Sportsmen with disabilities
Pakistani male sprinters
Medalists at the 2010 Asian Para Games